The Glass House was an American R&B/soul group from Detroit, Michigan, United States.

The Glass House was an assembly of house musicians put together by Holland-Dozier-Holland for their Invictus Records label in 1969. The group was led by Ty Hunter and included Scherrie Payne, sister of soul singer Freda Payne. The group released two albums and had a string of chart hits through 1972, peaking with 1969's "Crumbs Off The Table", but once their popularity had dried up, Invictus dissolved the group.

Shortly thereafter, Ty Hunter and Scherrie Payne joined the Motown roster. Ty joined the singing group The Originals. Scherrie Payne joined The Supremes.

Members
Scherrie Payne
Ty Hunter
Larry Mitchell
Sylvia Smith 
Pearl Jones

Discography

Singles

References

Musical groups from Michigan
American soul musical groups
1969 establishments in Michigan